Robert Diggelmann (20 January 1924 – 7 January 2018) was a Swiss wrestler. He competed in the men's Greco-Roman welterweight at the 1948 Summer Olympics.

References

External links
 

1924 births
2018 deaths
Swiss male sport wrestlers
Olympic wrestlers of Switzerland
Wrestlers at the 1948 Summer Olympics